The 1959 Tasmanian state election was held on 2 May 1959  in the Australian state of Tasmania to elect 35 members of the Tasmanian House of Assembly. The number of members were increased from this election from 30 to 35. The election used the Hare-Clark proportional representation system — seven members were elected from each of five electorates.

The two previous elections had resulted in a parliamentary deadlock due to an even number of seats (30) in the House of Assembly. Prior to the 1959 election, the number of seats was increased to 35.

Robert Cosgrove had retired as Premier of Tasmania, and had been replaced by Eric Reece on 26 August 1958.

Results

The Labor Party won the most seats in the newly expanded House of Assembly, but not enough to govern in a majority as two seats were won by Independents. The 1959 election was the last occasion in which an ungrouped independent (Bill Wedd) won a seat in Tasmania.

Former Labor Treasurer Dr Reg Turnbull won two quotas in his own right as an independent in Bass, representing 5.64% of the statewide result.

|}

Distribution of votes

Primary vote by division

Distribution of seats

See also
 Members of the Tasmanian House of Assembly, 1959–1964
 Candidates of the 1959 Tasmanian state election

References

External links
Assembly Election Results, 1959, Parliament of Tasmania.
Report on Parliamentary Elections, 1959, Tasmanian Electoral Commission.

Elections in Tasmania
1959 elections in Australia
1950s in Tasmania
May 1959 events in Australia